Robert Tait was a Scottish footballer who played in the Scottish League for Cowdenbeath and Motherwell as an inside forward.

Personal life 
After his retirement from football, Tait worked as a tailor in Cowdenbeath.

Career statistics

Honours 
Cowdenbeath
 Scottish League Division Two: 1913–14, 1914–15

Individual
Cowdenbeath Hall of Fame

References 

Scottish footballers
Cowdenbeath F.C. players
Scottish Football League players
Place of birth missing
Association football inside forwards
Glenbuck Cherrypickers F.C. players
Carlisle United F.C. players
English Football League players
Motherwell F.C. players
British tailors
Year of birth missing
1950 deaths
Nithsdale Wanderers F.C. players
Lochgelly United F.C. players